This is a list of governadores (Portuguese "governors"), interventores ("inspectors") and presidents of the  State of Rio de Janeiro, Brazil.

Governors

Cláudio Castro (2021–present) PL
Wilson Witzel             (2019–2021) PSC
Francisco Dornelles (interim) (2018) PP
Luiz Fernando Pezão       (2016–2018) PMDB
Francisco Dornelles (interim) (2016) PP
Luiz Fernando Pezão       (2014–2016) PMDB
Sérgio Cabral Filho	(2011–2014) PMDB
Sérgio Cabral Filho	(2007–2010) PMDB
Rosinha Garotinho	        (2003–2007) PSB
Benedita da Silva		(2002–2003) PT
Anthony Garotinho	        (1999–2002) PDT
Marcello Alencar		(1995–1999) PSDB
Nilo Batista	        (1994–1995) PDT
Leonel Brizola		(1991–1994) PDT
Moreira Franco		(1987–1991) PMDB
Leonel Brizola		(1983–1987) PDT
Antônio Chagas Freitas	(1979–1983) PDS
Floriano P. Faria Lima	(1974–1979)
Raimundo Padilha	        (1971–1974)
Mattos Fontes		(1967–1971)
Teotônio Ferreira		(1966–1967)
Paulo Francisco Torres	(1964–1966)
Cordolino José Ambrósio	(1964)
Badger Silveira		(1963–1964)
Luís Miguel Pinaud 	(1963)
José de Carvalho Jannotti	(1962–1963)
Celso Peçanha		(1961–1962)
Roberto Silveira		(1959–1961) PTB
Togo de Póvoa de Barros	(1958–1959)
Miguel Couto Filho 	(1955–1958)
Ernani do Amaral Peixoto	(1951–1955) PSD
Edmundo Macedo e Silva	(1947 António Pais de Sande1951)

 (1695–1697)
André Cusaco (1694–1695)
 (1693–1694)

Interventors
Álvaro Rocha Pereira da Silva         (1947)
F. de Paula Lupério Santos            (1947)
Hugo Silva   (1946–1947)
Lucio Martins Meira	           (1946)
Abel Sauerbronn		           (1945–1946)
Ernani do Amaral Peixoto              (1937–1945)
Protógenes Guimarães	           (1935–1937)
Newton Cavalcanti	                   (1935)
Ari Parreiras		           (1931–1935)
Pantaleão Pesoa		           (1931)
João Mena Barreto	                   (1931)
Plínio de Castro Casado	           (1930–1931)

Presidents of the State
Demécrito Barbosa	(1930)
Manuel de M. D. Silva 	(1927–1930)
Feliciano P. Abreu Sodré	(1923–1927)
Aurelino de Araújo Leal	(1923)
Feliciano P. Abreu Sodré	(1922–1923)
Raul de Morais Veiga	(1918–1922)
Angelo Geraque Collet	(1917–1918)
F. Xavier da S. Guimarães	(1917)
Nilo Peçanha		(1914–1917)
Chaves de Oliveira	        (1910–1914)
A. A. Guimarães Backer	(1906–1910)
Chaves de Oliveira	        (1906)
Nilo Peçanha		(1903–1906)
Quintino Bocaiúva	        (1900–1903)

Rio de Janeiro
Governors